Garden City is a suburban neighbourhood in Winnipeg, Manitoba.

The area features large homes and residential lots, numerous parks and schools, and includes Garden City Shopping Centre, a regional mall. The garden themes are continued throughout the development, with many floral inspired street names including Buttercup Avenue, Daffodil Street and Tulip Road.

The suburb is in the civic council ward of Old Kildonan, the community area of Seven Oaks, the provincial riding of McPhillips, and the federal riding of Kildonan—St. Paul.

History
The suburb was developed by Model Homes Limited, which estimated a cost of $20 million to develop the nearly  master planned community. Plans for the project were first announced in 1951; starting in 1955, the area was developed as an upscale master planned community during the post-World War II housing boom, with most of the houses constructed in the mid-century modern style.

The area's boundaries are the CPR Winnipeg Beach subdivision to the east, Carruthers Avenue to the south, McPhillips Street to the west, and Leila Avenue to the north. Prior to the City of Winnipeg's amalgamation in 1972, the neighbourhood made up a large portion of the former City of West Kildonan.

Model Homes Limited's plans for the development featured 1,500 homes, the Garden City shopping centre, six schools, churches, synagogues, parks and recreation areas. The area was marketed as the leading Winnipeg area suburb, featuring above average sized lots and larger homes. Expectations were that the building of Garden City would raise the population of the former City of West Kildonan from 14,000 to 20,000.

Modern architecture
The Garden City development is a showcase for mid-century modern architecture, with most of the homes in the area designed in a modernist-influenced ranch-style. Popular design elements include clean lines, large windows, carports and breeze block detailing and fencing. Many of the homes have retained these original features and the area has continued to grow in popularity with the resurgence of mid-century modern design.

Demographics
The area is home to a large portion of Winnipeg's Jewish community. Numerous synagogues, organizations, retirement homes and businesses catering to the Jewish community can be found throughout Garden City and the surrounding West Kildonan area. The neighbourhood also has many residents from Winnipeg's Ukrainian, German and Polish communities. Schools in the area feature both Hebrew and Ukrainian bilingual programs.

Points of interest

Public schools
Garden City is a part of the Seven Oaks School Division, and includes the following schools:

 Elementary
 Forest Park School
 R.F. Morrison School (features Ukrainian bilingual program)
 H.C. Avery School (features Hebrew and Ukrainian bilingual programs)
 Collicutt School
 High schools
 Garden City Collegiate (features French Immersion program)
 Met School - Garden City

Faith Academy Middle School is a private school in the neighbourhood.

Sports/athletic
 Garden City Community Centre
 Seven Oaks Sportsplex
 Seven Oaks Arena
 Seven Oaks Soccerplex

Other points of interest
 Garden City Shopping Centre
Seven Oaks House Museum
 Northgate Shopping Centre
 Chevra Mishnayes Synagogue
 Ten Ten Sinclair
 Mom's Perogy Factory

Sources

External links
 Winnipeg Census Information (2011)
 City of Winnipeg Neighbourhoods - Garden City 
 Seven Oaks School Division

Neighbourhoods in Winnipeg
Seven Oaks, Winnipeg